On Your Side may refer to:

Albums
 On Your Side (A Rocket to the Moon album) or the title song, 2009
 On Your Side (Gerald Walker album) or the title song, 2011
 On Your Side (Magnet album) or the title song, 2003
 On Your Side (EP) or the title song, by Cheerleader, 2014
 On Your Side EP, by Jacques Greene, 2013

Songs
 "On Your Side" (The Veronicas song), 2016
"On Your Side", by Goo Goo Dolls from Hold Me Up, 1990
"On Your Side", by the Innocence Mission from See You Tomorrow, 2020
"On Your Side", by Koda Kumi from Bon Voyage, 2014
"On Your Side", by Lange, 2015
"On Your Side", by Luna Halo from their 2007 self-titled album
"On Your Side", by Mary Milne
"On Your Side", by Pete Yorn from Musicforthemorningafter, 2001
"On Your Side", by Superfly from White, 2015
"On Your Side", by Thriving Ivory from Through Yourself & Back Again, 2010

See also
Tarafdaar (lit. On your side), a 2012 album by Shadmehr Aghili